Millville is an unincorporated community on the Shenandoah River in Jefferson County, West Virginia, United States. According to the Geographic Names Information System, Millville has also been known as Keye's Switch, Keyes Switch and Milville.

History
The community was named after the Millville Milling Company, the proprietors of a local gristmill.

References 

Unincorporated communities in Jefferson County, West Virginia
Unincorporated communities in West Virginia